Wang Yu (born 1 August 1981) is a Chinese former professional tennis player.

A left-handed player from Tianjin, Wang had a career high singles ranking of 309 on the professional tour and was a Chinese number one. His best performance in an ATP Tour tournament came at the 2005 China Open, where he won in the first round, against Luka Gregorc.

Wang won a silver medal for China partnering Xie Yanze in mixed doubles at the 2003 University Games in Daegu and was also an Asian Games representative player. At Davis Cup level, Wang was a regular fixture in the national side between 2000 and 2006, featuring in a total of 12 ties. He won six singles and one doubles rubber.

References

External links
 
 
 

1981 births
Living people
Chinese male tennis players
Tennis players from Tianjin
Tennis players at the 2002 Asian Games
Tennis players at the 2006 Asian Games
Asian Games competitors for China
Universiade medalists in tennis
Universiade silver medalists for China
Medalists at the 2003 Summer Universiade
21st-century Chinese people